"Last Memory" is a song by American rapper Takeoff. It was released on October 26, 2018 as the lead single from his debut studio album The Last Rocket (2018). It was written by Takeoff and the Monsta Beatz, who produced the song as well.

Composition 
C. Vernon Coleman II of XXL describes the song having "trap accents" and writes that Takeoff is "still flexing like no tomorrow." Takeoff raps about his success and "waking up after a night he can't remember."

Music video 
The music video was uploaded onto the YouTube channel of the Migos, which Takeoff is part of, on October 26, 2018. It finds Takeoff in a mansion, surrounded by women and wealth while rapping.

Live performances 
On November 20, 2018, Takeoff performed the song live on The Tonight Show Starring Jimmy Fallon.

Charts

Certifications

References 

2018 singles
2018 songs
Takeoff (rapper) songs
Songs written by Takeoff (rapper)
Universal Music Group singles
Capitol Records singles
Motown singles